Events in the year 2015 in Kosovo.

Incumbents 
 President: Atifete Jahjaga
 Prime Minister: Isa Mustafa

Events 
 6 January – Anti-government protests begin with a demonstration by "Thirrjet e nënave" ("The call of mothers") at the Serbian Orthodox Church in Gjakova.
 15 December – Kosovo participated in the Bala Turkvision Song Contest in Istanbul, finishing tenth.

Deaths

See also 

 2015 in Europe

References 

 
Kosovo
Kosovo
2010s in Kosovo
Years of the 21st century in Kosovo